China Mountain Zhang is a 1992 science fiction novel by American writer Maureen F. McHugh. The novel is made up of several stories loosely intertwined.

Title

The novel's title derives from the name of the protagonist, a  young gay man of mixed Chinese and Hispanic ancestry who goes by the name Rafael Zhang in non-Chinese contexts and Zhang Zhongshan in Chinese contexts. His Chinese given name, "Zhongshan", is written with the characters that have the primary meanings "center" and "mountain"; the Mandarin name for China also begins with the character meaning "center" or "middle". Thus, "China Mountain" is an alternate reading of his Chinese given name. As the novel explains, "Zhongshan" was one of the given names used by the Chinese revolutionary leader Sun Yat-sen, for whom the character is named.

Plot summary

The main story involves a man's maturation in a future dominated by China, where the United States has undergone a Second Great Depression, a Communist revolution and then a "Cleansing Winds Campaign" that resembled the Chinese Cultural Revolution. His personal evolution is paralleled in four interwoven side stories following characters progressing from outsiderdom to finding places in society.

Allusions/references to actual history, geography and current science
The backdrop is a 22nd-century in which the Chinese Communist regime dominates the world. The novel is slightly unusual for science fiction in that none of the characters cause any significant change in the world around them; nor does it use any standard science fiction tropes.

The New York Times said of the book when it first appeared: "A first novel this good gives every reader a chance to share in the pleasure of discovery; to my mind, Ms. McHugh's achievement recalls the best work of Samuel R. Delany and Kim Stanley Robinson without being in the least derivative."

Connections to other works

McHugh's short story "Protection" is set in the same future history as China Mountain Zhang, detailing the experiences of a petty criminal in a "Reform Through Labor" camp in Kansas under the future Communist system.

Awards and nominations
The novel was nominated for the Hugo Award for Best Novel and Nebula Award for Best Novel and won a Lambda Literary Award, the Locus Award for Best First Novel, and the James Tiptree, Jr. Award.

References

1992 American novels
1992 science fiction novels
1990s LGBT novels
American LGBT novels
American science fiction novels
Debut science fiction novels
James Tiptree Jr. Award-winning works
LGBT speculative fiction novels
Novels with gay themes
Lambda Literary Award-winning works
1992 debut novels
Tor Books books